Mammillaedrillia mammillata is a species of sea snail, a marine gastropod mollusk in the family Pseudomelatomidae, the turrids and allies.

Description
The length of the shell attains 50.5 mm, its diameter 16 mm.

Distribution
This marine species occurs in Sagami Bay, Japan and north of Taiwan

References

External links
 
 Gastropods.com: Compsodrillia (Mammillaedrillia) mammillata
 Chang, Chen-Kwoh, and W. U. Wen-Iung. "The Taiwan inquisitors (Gastropoda: Turridae)."

mammillata
Gastropods described in 1971